Anthessiidae is a family of cyclopoid copepods in the order Cyclopoida. There are about 7 genera and more than 60 described species in Anthessiidae.

Genera
These seven genera belong to the family Anthessiidae:
 Anthessius Della Valle, 1880
 Discanthessius Kim I.H., 2009
 Katanthessius Stock, 1960
 Neanthessius Izawa, 1976
 Panaietis Stebbing, 1900
 Pseudomolgus
 Rhinomolgus Sars G.O., 1918

References

Cyclopoida
Articles created by Qbugbot
Crustacean families